The Grigorovich MR-2 was a long-range reconnaissance flying boat designed by the Grigorovich Design Bureau for the Soviet Navy in the late 1920s.

Design
The MR-2 was similar to the MRL-1 but had a more powerful engine and larger upper wing, while the hull design was improved and less expensive materials used in its construction. Flights beginning in September 1926 impressed the MR-2's designers, and state acceptance trials were carried out by VVS pilot F.S.Rastegaev. One flight on October 19, however, ended in disaster when the MR-2 lost stability, and longitudinal oscillations with increasing amplitude resulted in steep dive, causing the aircraft to crash into the water up-side-down.

Specifications

References

Bibliography

Biplanes
Flying boats
1920s Soviet and Russian military reconnaissance aircraft
MR-2
Aircraft first flown in 1926